= Foot Africa =

Digital sports media platform

Foot-africa.com
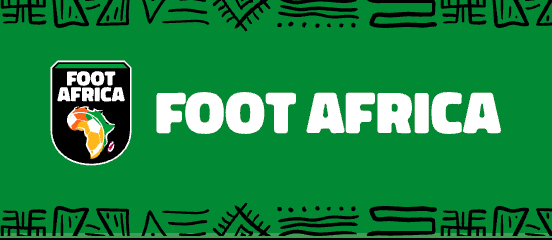
- Website type: Sports news (football)
- Available in: French · Arabic · English
- Area served: Worldwide
- Founder: Rafik (Rafik Zoghlami) (founder/editor-in-chief)
- Industry: Digital media, Sports journalism (football)
- Website: https://foot-africa.com/
- Launched: December 2009
- Current status: Active

Foot-africa.com is a digital sports media platform focused on African football. It publishes news, match reports, player and tactical analysis, interviews and community content aimed primarily at francophone and pan-African audiences, and operates a multilingual editorial service in French, Arabic and English.

== Overview ==
Foot Africa began in December 2009 by Rafik Zoghlami and evolved through earlier project names including "Star Africa" and "Orange Football Club" before adopting the Foot Africa brand.

The site covers national leagues, continental competitions (such as the Africa Cup of Nations and CAF club tournaments), the activities of African players abroad, transfer market news, tactical and player analysis, and original interviews.

It also emphasises discovery and promotion of young African talent and operates interactive discussion spaces intended to engage supporters. The editorial operation draws on correspondents across several African countries and publishes in French, Arabic and English.
